Bruno Alexandrovich von Vietinghoff was a Russian Captain 1st Rank of Baltic German origin. He was known for commanding the Navarin during the Battle of Tsushima of the Russo-Japanese War before being killed in the battle after the ship sunk.

Biography
Bruno was born on December 2, 1849 as a member of the House of Vietinghoff which was a Baltic German noble family. He enrolled in the Naval Cadet Corps on September 15, 1866. While training, he was aboard the  Gromoboi from June 3 to August 20, 1867, the Bayan from May 2 to August 18, 1868, the Marevo from May 25 to August 17, 1869, the Peresvet from June 11 to September 2, 1870 and the Memory of Mercury from October 13, 1870 to March 1, 1871. He graduated as Garde de la Marine on April 11, 1870 and was appointed to the 2nd Naval Crew on May 14. Vietinghoff sailed on the Pervenets from August 18 to September 25, 1871 and the Petropavlovsk from June 3 to September 25, 1871.

From November 18, 1873 to 1874 , he commanded the customs schooner Zorkaya, the Chasovoy from 1875 to 1877, promoted to Lieutenant on January 1, 1876 and assigned to the 6th Naval Crew on May 3, 1876 and was assigned to the 9th company of the Smerch before being at the disposal of the commander of the Customs Cruiser Flotilla on March 26, 1878. Vietinghoff commanded the Strazh from April 8, 1878 to April 23, 1884 and from April 7 to September 9, 1885, on the Zhemchug and was transferred to the 7th Naval Crew. On September 39, 1885, Vietinghoff was appointed to Komendor classes, promoted to Captain 2nd rank on January 1, 1887 and made Assistant chief for combat and economic parts 6 days later. He was made the senior officer of the Manjur from February 28 to July 22, 1887, commander of the Samoyed on November 4, 1891 and given command of the Smerch again on January 1, 1893. 

After being made a member of the Naval Court on June 25, 1893, he was transferred to the Chairman of the Selection Committee at the steamship plant. He traveled to Baku on January 30, 1895 to be appointed commander of the Geok-Tepe as well as being transferred to the 3rd Naval Crew on November 11, 1897 but was transferred to the Revel naval half-crew 6 days later. Vietinghoff was made acting-commander of the port of Reval on January 25, 1898 before being made official commander on March 21. On March 13, 1900, he commanded the Kreml but transferred to the Artillery Training Detachment on October 18. During the Russo-Japanese War, he commanded the Navarin and during the Battle of Tsushima, he was severely wounded on the stomach and legs from a Japanese shrapnel while at the top and decided to go down with the ship. Mikhail Osipovich Menshikov wrote a letter to the Russian government to memorialize the battle, writing:

Awards
Order of Saint Stanislaus, III Class (April 13, 1875)
Order of Saint Anna, III Class (April 20, 1880)
Order of Saint Vladimir, IV Class (August 22, 1886)
Order of Saint Vladimir II Class (January 1, 1890)
Order of Saint Anna, II Class (June 6, 1896)

Foreign Awards
: Order of the Lion and the Sun, II Class (June 13, 1896)

References

1849 births
1905 deaths
Baltic-German people
Livonian nobility
People from the Governorate of Livonia
Imperial Russian Navy officers
Russian military personnel of the Russo-Japanese War
Russian military personnel killed in the Russo-Japanese War
Recipients of the Order of St. Anna, 2nd class
Recipients of the Order of St. Anna, 3rd class
Recipients of the Order of St. Vladimir, 2nd class
Recipients of the Order of St. Vladimir, 4th class
Recipients of the Order of Saint Stanislaus (Russian), 2nd class
Naval Cadet Corps alumni
Bruno von Vietinghoff